Special Herbs, Vols. 7 & 8 is an instrumental album released by MF Doom under the moniker Metal Fingers.  As with all volumes of Special Herbs released by Metal Fingers, each track is named after a herb or similar flora.  Although being an instrumental album, some tracks contain sampled speech.

Track listing
 "Safed Musli" – 3:15
 "Emblica Officinalis" – 4:50
 "Licorice" – 3:05
 "Sarsaparilla" – 3:39
 "Fo Ti" – 2:49
 "Camphor" – 1:50
 "High John" – 4:31
 "Mandrake" – 2:34 
 "Devil's Shoestring" – 4:25
 "Wormwood" – 3:19
 "Cedar" – 3:35
 "Buckeyes" – 3:04
 "Chrysanthemum Flowers" – 3:54

Other versions
 "Safed Musli" is an instrumental version of "Slow Down" by Masta Ace, from the album MA Doom: Son of Yvonne, and of "Oh Dear" by Joey Bada$$, from the album Rejex.
 "Emblica Officinalis" is an instrumental version of a section of "Anarchist Bookstore Pt. 2" by MC Paul Barman, from the album Paullelujah!.
 "Licorice" is an instrumental version of "Sorcerers" by KMD, from the Shaman Works label compilation Shaman Work: Family Files.
 "Sarsaparilla" is an instrumental version of "Anti-Matter" by King Geedorah featuring MF Doom and Mr. Fantastik, from the album Take Me to Your Leader.
 "Fo Ti" is an instrumental version of "Coming For You" by NehruvianDOOM, from their self-titled album.
 "Camphor" is an instrumental version of "Intro Outside Perspective" by John Robinson from the album Who Is This Man?
 "High John" is an instrumental version of "95" by Isaiah Rashad from the album Welcome To The Game.
 "Mandrake" is an instrumental version of "Perfect Day" by Dem Atlas, from the album mF deM.
 "Wormwood" is an instrumental version of "Lockjaw" by King Geedorah featuring Trunks, and of "One Smart Nigger" by King Geedorah, both from the album Take Me to Your Leader.
 "Cedar" is an instrumental version of "The Replenish" by John Robinson from the album Who Is This Man?
 "Buckeyes" is an instrumental version of "Fazers" by King Geedorah, from the album Take Me to Your Leader.
 "Chrysanthemum Flowers" is an instrumental version of MF DOOM's "Outro" to the compilation Spitkicker Presents: The Next Spit Vol. 3 as well as being an instrumental version of "Expressions" featuring Tiffany Paige by John Robinson from the album Who Is This Man?.

External links
 Special herbs guide

MF Doom albums
2004 albums
Instrumental hip hop albums